The Roman Catholic Diocese of Málaga–Soatá is a diocese located in the cities of Málaga and Soatá in the Ecclesiastical province of Bucaramanga in Colombia.

History
 7 July 1987: Established as Diocese of Málaga – Soatá from the Metropolitan Archdiocese of Bucaramanga and Diocese of Duitama.

Bishops

Ordinaries
Hernán Giraldo Jaramillo (1987.07.07 – 2001.01.19) Appointed, Bishop of Buga
Darío de Jesús Monsalve Mejía (2001.07.25 – 2010.06.03) Appointed, Coadjutor Archbishop of Cali
Víctor Manuel Ochoa Cadavid (2011.01.24 – 2015.07.24) Appointed, Bishop of Cúcuta
José Libardo Garcés Monsalve (2016.06.29 - 2021.11.20)
Félix Ramírez Barajas (2022.10.01 - present)

Other priest of this diocese who became bishop
Hency Martínez Vargas, appointed Bishop of La Dorada-Guaduas in 2019

See also
Roman Catholicism in Colombia

Sources

External links
 Catholic Hierarchy
 GCatholic.org

Roman Catholic dioceses in Colombia
Roman Catholic Ecclesiastical Province of Bucaramanga
Christian organizations established in 1987
Roman Catholic dioceses and prelatures established in the 20th century